In boxing, kickboxing and mixed martial arts, a gatekeeper is a skillful and well-regarded fighter, but one who does not have the popularity or brilliance of a title contender. They are considered to be a cut above most journeymen. A gatekeeper will often have an impressive record in terms of wins versus losses but will have a difficult time getting people behind them and especially obtaining promotion. They are often seen as a "stepping-stone" for potential title contenders to prove their worth against.

Characteristics
Gatekeepers will frequently have the following characteristics:

 They're sometimes relegated to fight contenders to boost the contender's stock shortly before a title fight.

Notable examples
The following fighters have all been described as gatekeepers:
Monte Barrett
Edison Miranda
Jameel McCline
Raymond Joval
Earnie Shavers
Carlos Takam
Ross Puritty
Bert Cooper
Saul Montana
Dennis Bakhtov
Robert Hawkins
Friday Ahunanya
Vaughn Bean
Przemyslaw Saleta
Louis Monaco
Danny García
Tony Thompson
Chris Arreola
Felix Verdejo

Notable MMA examples
Gary Goodridge
Karolina Kowalkiewicz
Raquel Pennington
Marion Reneau
Jeremy Stephens
Tecia Torres
Cat Zingano
Donald Cerrone
Michael Johnson
Diego Sanchez
Jorge Masvidal
Clay Guida

See also
Journeyman (boxing)
Tomato can (sports idiom)

References

Boxing terminology